Zervodexios is a form of a Greek folk dance from Macedonia and Thrace, Greece.

See also
Music of Greece
Greek dances

References
Ζερβοδεξιός χορός

Greek dances